Tazeh Kand-e Qarah Naz (also Romanized as Tāzeh Kand-e Qarah Nāz and Tāzeh Kand-e Qarahnāz; also known as Qarah Nāz and Tāzeh Kand) is a village in Qareh Naz Rural District, in the Central District of Maragheh County, East Azerbaijan Province, Iran. At the 2006 census, its population was 195, in 43 families.

References 

Towns and villages in Maragheh County